The Islamic Center and Mosque of Grand Rapids is a mosque and Islamic Center located in Grand Rapids, Michigan, United States, near Burton St and Kalamazoo Ave. This was the first registered Mosque and Islamic Center established in the Grand Rapids, Michigan in 1986. It opened its doors for Muslim worshipers on the 12th of "Rabi-ul Awal" (the birthday of the prophet Mohammad). The building was previously a church for Jehovah's Witnesses.

The center is Sufi, non-political, Pakistani, and run by volunteers, except for the "Imam" who is salaried. There are no membership dues. Many of the worshipers leave donations in a box anonymously. The center was established for the Muslim Community by a family anonymously.

The Imam of the center is a speaker at interfaith events and in schools. They ran a Blood Drive for the 9/11 victims.

In addition to the Islamic Center and Mosque of Grand Rapids, the center is known to the Muslims in the area by other names, such as Western Michigan Islamic Center and Mosque or the "Masjid".

See also
  List of mosques in the Americas
  Lists of mosques 
  List of mosques in the United States

References

Reference: www.Michigan.gov, id 725449.

External links
 

Mosques in Michigan
1986 establishments in Michigan
Mosques completed in 1986